A mob, short for mobile or mobile object, is a computer-controlled non-player character (NPC) in a video game such as an MMORPG or MUD. Depending on context, every and any such character in a game may be considered to be a "mob", or usage of the term may be limited to hostile NPCs and/or NPCs vulnerable to attack.

In most modern graphical games, "mob" may be used to specifically refer to generic monstrous NPCs that the player is expected to hunt and kill, excluding NPCs that engage in dialog, sell items, or NPCs which cannot be attacked. "Named mobs" are distinguished by having a proper name rather than being referred to by a general type ("a goblin", "a citizen", etc.). Most mobs are those capable of no complex behaviors beyond generic programming of attacking or moving around.

Purpose of mobs 
Defeating mobs may be required to gather experience points, money, items, or to complete quests. Combat between player characters (PCs) and mobs is called player versus environment (PvE). PCs may also attack mobs because they aggressively attack PCs. Monster versus monster (MvM) battles also take place in some games.

A game world might contain hundreds of different kinds of mobs, but if players spend a certain amount of time playing, they might become well aware of the characteristics presented by each kind and its related hazard. This knowledge might dull the game to some extent.

Etymology 
The term "mobile object"  was used by Richard Bartle for objects that were self-mobile in MUD1. Later source code in DikuMUD used the term "mobile" to refer to a generic NPC, shortened further to "mob" in identifiers. DikuMUD was a heavy influence on EverQuest, and the term as it exists in MMORPGs is derived from the MUD usage.. The term is properly an abbreviation rather than an acronym.

References 

Massively multiplayer online role-playing games
MUD terminology
Video game terminology